Tim Foley may refer to:
 Tim Foley (defensive back) (born 1948), American football player for the Miami Dolphins
 Tim Foley (offensive tackle) (born 1958), American footballplayer for the Baltimore Colts